Brian Allen (born August 6, 1962) is a former gridiron football wide receiver who played one game for the Edmonton Eskimos of the Canadian Football League in 1984 and with the Washington Redskins in 1984  the National Football League on the practice squad. He played college football for the Idaho Vandals. In the 1984 USFL Collegiate Draft, Allen was selected in the 15th round by the Oklahoma Outlaws with the 314th pick, but he didn't play with the Outlaws.

References 

1962 births
Living people
American football wide receivers
Canadian football wide receivers
Hutchinson Blue Dragons football players
Idaho Vandals football players
Edmonton Elks players
Players of American football from California
Players of Canadian football from California
Sportspeople from San Bernardino, California